Christopher André Marks is a Greek American film director, film producer, and screenwriter, best known for the 2021 film King Otto.

Early life 
Marks grew up in California. His family was in the Latin music industry, however he was raised Greek, often returning to Athens throughout his childhood. He began his career at The Weinstein Company and moved on to work with ESPN and HBO. He attended New York University's Tisch of the Arts film program.  He speaks 4 languages, English, Greek, Italian and Spanish.

Career

His directorial feature debut, King Otto, on the Greek National Soccer Team's victory at Euro 2004, opened to wide international critical acclaim from outlets such as the Los Angeles Times, The Guardian, The Australian, Süddeutsche Zeitung, The Times and The Daily Telegraph. It is marked as "fresh" on critic aggregate website Rotten Tomatoes. David Stratton of the Australian said "Full marks must be awarded to director Christopher Andre Marks for telling this real-life feel-good story so well and so entertainingly - even the most unlikely subject, in the right hands, can make for compelling drama." John Macdonald of the Financial Review said, "Christopher Andre Marks’ irresistible King Otto manages to confirm and confound every idea about the contrasts between the Greeks and the Germans." Noel Murray of the Los Angeles Times says "Christopher Andre Marks' entertaining sports film King Otto - is a great story, crisply told"  Cris Kennedy of the Canberra Times states that "Marks and his team build their pace and suspense so well that even die-hard fans who saw the footage the first time around will have their hearts in their throats".

It was released theatrically and on streaming platforms in over 75 countries via partners such as Warner Bros. Discovery, Sky UK, Sky Deutschland and Canal+. As the film is about a German working with the Greek National Team, Marks states that the film's central focal point is on what "unites us versus what divides us" as people. It was Marks' Greek-American background that inspired him to make King Otto. Marks stated to Kathimerini that his next two projects will be shot in Greece and are currently in development.

In 2015, he directed and produced the film Tiger Hood for ESPN Films' Emmy Award Winning '30 for 30' series. The film had its world premiere at the 2015 South by Southwest and was released in the United States and Canada on ESPN, ESPN2 and SportsCenter.

References

Living people
American film directors
American people of Greek descent
Year of birth missing (living people)